Zhenan may refer to:

Zhen'an County (镇安县), Shangluo, Shaanxi
Zhen'an District (振安区), Dandong, Liaoning
Zhenan Min (浙南闽语), variety of Min Nan Chinese spoken in southern Zhejiang
Towns (镇安镇)
Zhen'an, Kai County, in Kai County, Chongqing
Zhen'an, Yun'an County, Guangdong
Zhen'an, Longling County, in Longling County, Yunnan